is a Japanese voice actress.

Voice roles

Anime
Black Blood Brothers, Chan's mother
Elemental Gelade, Daya; Garne
Gakuen Utopia Manabi Straight! (OAV), Mika's mother
GaoGaiGar: King of Braves, Intestine; Mother Kaidô
Kimi ni Todoke, Yoko Chiba
Koe de Oshigoto!, Fuyumi Hirobe
Kono Aozora ni Yakusoku o: Yōkoso Tsugumi Ryō e, Umi HayamaMoonPhase, Elfriede's motherNoramimi, Taizou's motherOneechan ga Kita, Yūko MizuharaPersona: Trinity Soul, Haruka KanzatoPopotan, Nurse 1Red Garden, IsabelSlayers, GirlSlayers Revolution, WaitressVenus Versus Virus, SonokaWhite Album, YamamotoWorld Break: Aria of Curse for a Holy Swordsman, Vasilisa Yuryevna Mostvaya

 OVA Koe de Oshigoto!'', Fuyumi Hirobe

References
Provit-V

External links

Crunchyroll
Provit-V

Living people
Japanese voice actresses
People from Tokyo
Year of birth missing (living people)